Karband (also Romanized as Kārband; also known as Kārban) is a village in Asalem Rural District, Asalem District, Talesh County, Gilan Province, Iran. At the 2006 census, its population was 407, in 90 families.

References 

Populated places in Talesh County